Sardesai is an Indian surname that may refer to
Dilip Sardesai (1940–2007), Indian cricketer
Govind Sakharam Sardesai (1865–1959), Indian historian
Hema Sardesai, Indian playback singer 
Madhavi Sardesai (1962–2014), Indian scholar, publisher and writer 
Manohar Rai Sardesai (1925–2006), Indian poet and writer 
Nitin Sardesai (born 1963), Indian politician 
Rajdeep Sardesai (born 1965), Indian news anchor and author
S. G. Sardesai (1907–1996), Indian communist leader
Vijai Sardesai (born 1970), Indian politician